The Clutching Hand (in full, The Amazing Exploits of the Clutching Hand) is a 15-episode serial produced by the Weiss Brothers in 1936, based on the final Craig Kennedy novel of the 1934 same name by Arthur B. Reeve. A 70-minute feature film using a condensed version of the serial was also released in the same year.

In it, the famous detective (portrayed by Jack Mulhall, who had portrayed the Black Ace in the serial The Mystery Squadron three years before) is assigned to solve the disappearance of Dr. Paul Gironda (Robert Frazer), a scientist who has developed a formula for synthesizing gold but vanishes before he has a chance to reveal it to his board of directors.

The Clutching Hand was the last Craig Kennedy serial and the only one to be filmed as a talkie.  One of the criminals, Hobart, is played by Charles Locher, who is better known nowadays as Jon Hall, and it appears that Gironda is being held prisoner by Craig Kennedy's old foe, the Clutching Hand (a faceless presence apparently played by Bud Geary, an actor who was frequently cast in such roles, and voiced by Robert Frazer).

Plot

The serial was based very loosely on Arthur Reeve's final novel and in it, the Clutching Hand has a new secret identity: Dr. Paul Gironda, the very man whom Kennedy is looking for.  Having almost exhausted the estate of his young ward Vera, he has come up with the idea of using a fake synthetic gold formula to recoup his losses on the stock market, but just before he disappears, one of his assistants steals the notebook containing the formula.  Unable to find it, he fakes his disappearance and goes into hiding, assuming the identity of Craig Kennedy's foe, the Clutching Hand, who was seemingly disposed of in The Exploits of Elaine years before.  (The Clutching Hand had a totally different identity in that serial.) Supposedly holding Gironda captive in an induced coma, the Hand demands the missing pages of the gold formula from his wife and "daughter."  At the same time as Gironda vanishes, Mitchell -–Vera's real father and Mrs. Gironda's first husband – is released from prison after serving a full sentence on a blackmail charge, forcing the Hand to try to dispose of Mitchell before Vera can learn of her true identity.

Cast
Jack Mulhall as Craig Kennedy
Ruth Mix as Shirley McMillan
Rex Lease as Walter Jameson
Marion Shilling as Verna Gironda
Mae Busch as Mrs. Gironda
Gaston Glass as Dr. Louis Bouchard
Bryant Washburn as Dr. Denton
Franklyn Farnum as Lab Tech Nicky
William Farnum as Insp. Gordon Gaunt
Robert Walker as Joe Mitchell
Charles Locher as Frank Hobart
Reed Howes as Sullivan, private eye
Frank Leigh as Wickham the butler
George Morrell as Jenkins the butler
Yakima Canutt as "Number 8"
Bob Kortman as "Number 6"
Ray Cardona as "Number 2"
Joseph W. Girard as Attorney Cromwell
Knute Erikson as Capt. Hansen
Richard Alexander as Mate Olaf
Robert Frazer as Dr. Paul Gironda

Chapter listing
This is a partial list of chapters:

Chapter 1 - Who Is The Clutching Hand?
Chapter 2 - Shadow
Chapter 3 - House of Mystery
Chapter 4 - The Phantom Car
Chapter 5 - The Double Trap
Chapter 6 - Steps of Doom
Chapter 7 - The Invisible Enemy
Chapter 8 - A Cry in the Night
Chapter 9 - Evil Eyes
Chapter 10 - A Desperate Chance
Chapter 11 - The Ship of Doom
Chapter 12 - Hidden Danger
Chapter 13 - The Mystic Menace
Chapter 14 - The Silent Spectre
Chapter 15 - The Lone Hand

Chapter Thirteen is titled "The Mystic Menace," and yet nothing mystical happens – it is a pretty standard serial chapter.  However, the serial makers – the Weiss Brothers, in this case – could not alter the chapter titles for some reason.  This was apparently the brothers' final serial and their last Craig Kennedy adaptation, although in 1952 the Weiss Brothers produced a television show called Craig Kennedy, Criminologist.

Notes

External links

 
 The Clutching Hand at Internet Archive
 The serial itself can be found at CamelotBroadcasting.com
 The Clutching Hand complete Series on YouTube (public domain)

1936 films
1936 mystery films
American black-and-white films
American mystery films
Films scored by Bernard B. Brown
Film serials
Films based on American novels
Films based on mystery novels
Articles containing video clips
1930s American films